Bakhtawar Singh Basnyat was Mulkazi (Chief Kazi) of Nepal.

Mulkazi Kirtiman Singh Basnyat who was backed by Queen Regent Subarna Prabha Devi, was secretly assassinated on 28 September 1801, by the supporters of Raj Rajeshwari Devi. Damodar Pande was also blamed for the murder. During the investigation, many were punished without any evidence and he was given the position and title held by his brother Kirtiman Singh for a brief period.

During his tenure as the mul kaji, on 28 October 1801, a Treaty of Commerce and Alliance was finally signed between Nepal and East India Company. This led to the establishment of the first British Resident, Captain William O. Knox, who was reluctantly welcomed by the courtiers in Kathmandu on 16 April 1802. The primary objective of Knox's mission was to bring the trade treaty of 1792 into full effect and to establish a "controlling influence" in Nepali politics. Almost eight months after the establishment of the Residency, Rajrajeshowri finally managed to assume the regency on 17 December 1802. Rajrajeshowri's presence in Kathmandu also stirred unrest among the courtiers that aligned themselves around her and Subarnaprabha. Sensing an imminent hostility, Knox aligned himself with Subarnaprabha and attempted to interfere with the internal politics of Nepal. Getting a wind of this matter, Rajrajeshowri dissolved the government and elected new ministers, with Damodar Pande as the Chief (Mul) Kaji on February 1803, while the Resident Knox, finding himself persona non grata and the objectives of his mission frustrated, voluntarily left Kathmandu to reside in Makwanpur citing a cholera epidemic.

Notes

References

Bibliography 

 
 

 

Nepalese military personnel
Basnyat family
Mulkajis
People of the Nepalese unification
1759 births
1840 deaths